Ignatyevo is a rural locality (a village) in Borisoglebskoye Rural Settlement, Muromsky District, Vladimir Oblast, Russia. The population was 2 as of 2010. There are 2 streets.

Geography 
Ignatyevo is located 30 km northwest of Murom (the district's administrative centre) by road. Talyzino is the nearest rural locality.

References 

Rural localities in Muromsky District
Muromsky Uyezd